The 2003–04 NBA season was the Hawks' 55th season in the National Basketball Association, and 36th season in Atlanta. During the offseason, the Hawks signed free agent Stephen Jackson, while re-signing Jacque Vaughn after one season with the Orlando Magic. The Hawks continued to struggle losing eight of their first eleven games. At midseason, they traded Shareef Abdur-Rahim and Theo Ratliff to the Portland Trail Blazers for All-Star forward Rasheed Wallace. However, Wallace only played just one game for the Hawks before being traded to the Detroit Pistons for Bob Sura. Wallace would win a championship with the Pistons as they defeated the Los Angeles Lakers in five games in the NBA Finals. The team also traded Nazr Mohammed to the New York Knicks, and acquired Joel Przybilla from the Milwaukee Bucks, while Dion Glover was released to free agency and signed with the Toronto Raptors.

With the lack of big men on the team, and with Przybilla only playing just twelve games due to a knee injury, the Hawks signed free agent center Jason Collier in March. The team finished seventh in the Central Division with a 28–54 record. Jackson led the Hawks in scoring with 18.1 points per game, while Jason Terry averaged 16.8 points, 5.4 assists and 1.5 steals per game. Following the season, head coach Terry Stotts was fired, Jackson was traded to the Indiana Pacers, Terry and longtime Hawks forward Alan Henderson were both dealt to the Dallas Mavericks, Sura signed as a free agent with the Houston Rockets, Vaughn signed with the New Jersey Nets, and Przybilla signed with the Portland Trail Blazers.

Offseason

Draft picks

Roster

Roster Notes
 Power forward Obinna Ekezie missed the entire season due to a torn ACL in his right knee.

Regular season

Season standings

z - clinched division title
y - clinched division title
x - clinched playoff spot

Record vs. opponents

Game log

Player statistics

Season

Player Statistics Citation:

Awards and records

Transactions

References

See also
 2003-04 NBA season

Atlanta Hawks seasons
Atlanta Haw
Atlanta Haw
Atlanta Hawks